{{DISPLAYTITLE:C19H23NO4}}
The molecular formula C19H23NO4 (molar mass : 329.39 g/mol, exact mass : 329.162708) may refer to:

 14-Methoxymetopon
 Methylecgonine cinnamate
 Naloxol
 Reticuline
 Salutaridinol, an alkaloid
 Sinomenine, an alkaloid